"Work That!" is the third single from Japanese hip-hop group Teriyaki Boyz's studio album Serious Japanese. The song features Pharrell and Chris Brown.

Composition
Allmusic editor Adam Greenberg described this song as "the Chris Brown-heavy "Work That," with its mix of Daft Punk-style backing tracks and Dirty South edge."

Charts
"Work That!" peaked at number 7 on the Japan Hot 100 Singles chart on the chart week of January 27, 2009.

References

2009 singles
Pharrell Williams songs
Chris Brown songs
2009 songs
Song recordings produced by Pharrell Williams
Star Trak Entertainment singles
Songs written by Pharrell Williams